The history of rugby union matches between France and Scotland dates back to 1910 when the two teams played against each other in Edinburgh. Scotland won the match 27–0. Since then there have been a total of 100 games played, resulting in 58 wins for France, 39 wins for Scotland and 3 draws, as of February 2023.

During rugby union's amateur era, the overall history of the fixture was relatively even - up to the end of the 1995 Rugby World Cup the sides had met 67 times with France winning 33 games and Scotland 31. Since then there has been a marked shift in favour of France, who have won 25 of the 33 matches between the teams since 1996.

Scotland and France play each other at least once a year, as both participate in the Six Nations Championship, and its predecessor competitions. In 2018 a new trophy, the Auld Alliance Trophy, was inaugurated to be presented to the winner of the Six Nations fixture each year.

Summary

Overall

Records
Note: Date shown in brackets indicates when the record was or last set.

Breakdown

In the World Cup, the teams have played on three occasions, with France winning two, Scotland none and one match drawn. In these games, France have scored 93 points, and Scotland 48.

In the Five Nations (1910–1999), France played Scotland on 69 occasions, France winning 34, Scotland 33 and two matches were drawn. In these games, France scored 756 points, and Scotland 819.

In the Six Nations (2000–present), France have played Scotland on 22 occasions, France winning 17, Scotland 5 and no matches have been drawn. In these games, France have scored 504 points, and Scotland 330.

Results
The matches played between France and Scotland are:

Note: The 1920 Five Nations Championship was known in France as le match des borgnes (the one-eyed match) because five players between the two sides had lost an eye in World War I.

References 

 
Scotland national rugby union team matches
France national rugby union team matches
Six Nations Championship
France–Scotland relations